Conca dei Marini is a town and comune in the province of Salerno in the Campania region of south-western Italy.

It was perhaps founded by the Etruscans with the name of Cossa, and was conquered by the Romans in 272 BC. In the early Middle Ages, it  was a trading base of the Republic of Amalfi. In 1543 it was sacked by Turkish pirates. The port maintained a certain degree of trades until the 19th century, and was also the seat of a tonnara until 1956.

Main sights

Grotta dello Smeraldo, a karst sea cave
Church of St. John the Baptist or of St. Anthony of Padua
Church of Santa Maria di Grado
Capo Conca Tower, a 16th-century sea watchtower
Church of St. Pancratius Martyr

See also
Fiordo di Furore
Amalfi Coast
Sorrentine Peninsula

References

External links

 Official website

Cities and towns in Campania
Amalfi Coast
Coastal towns in Campania